Lac Vert is a lake at Catus in the Lot department, France. At an elevation of 160 m, its surface area is 0.07 km².

Vert, Lot